Alexander MacNaughton Scott (17 November 1922 – 27 August 1995) was a Scottish footballer who played in the Football League for Carlisle United and Leicester City.

References

External links
 

1922 births
1995 deaths
Scottish footballers
English Football League players
Leicester City F.C. players
Carlisle United F.C. players
South Shields F.C. (1936) players
Association football defenders
FA Cup Final players